Muhammad Shahbaz Shabbir Gill, commonly known as Shahbaz Gill, is a Pakistani academician, lecturer, politician, former provincial spokesperson to the Government of Punjab, Pakistan, and Special Assistant to the Prime Minister (SAPM) of Pakistan to Imran Khan. He was a member of the Imran Khan cabinet from 13 May to 3 April 2022. Currently he is the Chief of Staff of former Prime Minister Imran Khan following Khan's removal from office in April 2022.

Early life
Gill was born in Faisalabad and received his early education there. He then pursued higher education abroad. He received a Ph.D. in Management and Leadership from the University of Malaya in 2008. He started his teaching career in 2004 and has been a part of the faculty of Quaid-i-Azam University and International Islamic University, Islamabad, before finally moving to COMSATS University, Lahore. At the University of Illinois, he worked as a Clinical Assistant Professor of Business Administration.

Career

Academic
Gill has been an assistant professor of business administration at the University of Illinois Urbana-Champaign since 2019.

Political
Gill was appointed as a spokesperson for the Chief Minister of Punjab, Pakistan, Usman Buzdar in 2018. In March 2019, Buzdar appointed him to inspect the government institutions and offices on his behalf. He resigned from the post of spokesperson on 13 September 2019.

Arrest
On 9 August 2022, Gill was arrested on charges of sedition for allegedly trying to incite Pakistani army officers to mutiny. Gill was reportedly "dragged out of his vehicle" before being taken into custody. Gill was arrested for statements he made on ARY News on 8 August about alleged rifts within Pakistan's military over Imran Khan's ouster from office during the no-confidence motion in April 2022.

Gill testified in court that he had been on a hunger strike for four days and was not allowed to change his clothes and take a bath. Shahbaz's request for judicial remand was denied and police granted his requested two-day physical remand. While in custody, he and his party, Pakistan Tehreek-e-Insaf, claimed that he was sexually assaulted. However, in a written statement submitted before the court, Gill stated that he hadn't been sexually assaulted by the police while in detention, though he still said that he was subjected to torture by investigators. Lawyers for Gill submitted a medical report by doctors of Central Jail Rawalpindi in which they declared that Gill was tortured.

On 15 September 2022, Gill was released from Central Jail Rawalpindi on bail.

References

Living people
Politicians from Faisalabad
Pakistan Tehreek-e-Insaf politicians
Prisoners and detainees of Pakistan
Punjabi people
University of Malaya alumni
Academic staff of Quaid-i-Azam University
Academic staff of the International Islamic University, Islamabad
University of Illinois Urbana-Champaign faculty
Year of birth missing (living people)